Hendrick Berckman (1629 – buried 27 March 1679) was a Dutch Golden Age painter.

Biography
He was a pupil of Thomas Willeboirts Bosschaert and Jacob Jordaens in Antwerp, and spent some time in Haarlem studying with Philip Wouwermans. He is registered in Leiden from 1652 to 1654, and in 1655 he settled in Middleburg. Though he trained as a landscape painter, he is most known today for his portraits of respected members of the elite.

According to Houbraken, he was a promising young painter of "batalje" or small-scale battle-pieces, who was advised by Jacob Jordaens to try making large paintings, which he did.

References

External links
 

1629 births
1679 deaths
Dutch Golden Age painters
Dutch male painters
People from Moerdijk